The Khulna Shipyard Limited is a Bangladeshi state owned defense contractor based in Khulna, Bangladesh. It is located on 68.97 acres of land at Labanchara, Khulna, Bangladesh. It is about 45 km north from the Port of Mongla. The shipyard has the capacity to build steel / aluminium ships up to 90 m length and 700 tons lightweight. The shipyard has a slipway with a capacity to dock and undock vessels up to 700 tons lightweight and overall length of 84 meters.

The KSY Limited is the largest military shipbuilding company in Bangladesh, and one of Asia's largest builder of complex warships. It has built numerous small to medium sized patrol crafts, boats, oil tankers and other vessels for the Bangladesh Navy, the Bangladesh Coast Guard and other organizations. As of January 2022, the shipyard has completed a total of 775 shipbuilding (including all categories) and 2,363 ship repair work.

History
The construction works of KSY started in 1954 under supervision of the East Pakistan Industrial Development Corporation (EPIDC) with the technical support of M/s. Stulcken Sohn, who provided the design for the construction of the yard facilities. After completion of works, It was commissioned on 27 November 1957, with the objective to build and repair ships of various clients, for defense, coast guard, oil company, ports and manufacture engineering parts to support other industries.

Burness Corleft+Partner and Maienform administratively and technically managed the company up to 1967. Afterwards the control was vested with its own expert engineers both technically and administratively.

On 3 October 1999, the Bangladesh Navy took over the responsibilities of KSY along with a 993.7 million taka debt. By 2008, all outstanding debts were cleared and since then, the shipyard has been making profit.

In 2015, the Maldives had expressed interest in procuring patrol craft for its Coast Guard.

Projects

Padma and Sobuj Bangla-class patrol vessel
Under the first phase of FG2030 naval modernization program, Khulna Shipyard was given the contract to build an undisclosed number of Padma-class patrol vessel for the Bangladesh Navy and Sobuj Bangla-class batch 2 for the Bangladesh Coast Guard. On 2 May 2010, the Navy signed a contract for five vessel. On 17 July 2016, the Bangladesh Coast Guard awarded a contract for three vessel. On 20 May 2019, the Navy ordered five additional vessel.

Completed

1978 - BNS Sahayak (A 512), a fleet replenishment ship, for Bangladesh Navy
1987 - BNFC Balaban (A 731), a floating crane, for Bangladesh Navy
2004 - BNT Rupsha (A 723), a Fleet coastal tug, for Bangladesh Navy
2004 - BNT Shibsha (A 724), a Fleet coastal tug, for Bangladesh Navy
2012 - BNS Padma (P 312), a patrol vessel, for Bangladesh Navy
2013 - BNS Surma (P 313), a patrol vessel, for Bangladesh Navy
2013 - BNS Aparajeya (P 261), a patrol vessel, for Bangladesh Navy
2013 - BNS Adamya (P 262), a patrol vessel, for Bangladesh Navy
2013 - BNS Atandra (P 263), a patrol vessel, for Bangladesh Navy
2015 - BNS Hatiya, a Landing Craft Utility, for Bangladesh Navy
2015 - BNS Swandwip, a Landing Craft Utility, for Bangladesh Navy 
2016 - BNS Durgam (P 814), a ASW patrol craft, for Bangladesh Navy
2017 - BNS Nishan (P 815), a ASW patrol craft, for Bangladesh Navy
2017 - BNT Halda (A 725), a Fleet coastal tug, for Bangladesh Navy
2017 - BNT Poshur (A 726), a Fleet coastal tug, for Bangladesh Navy
2018 - CGS Sonar Bangla (P 204), a patrol vessel, for Bangladesh Coast Guard
2018 - CGS Aparajeya Bangla (P 205), a patrol vessel, for Bangladesh Coast Guard
2018 - CGS Shadhin Bangla (P 206), a patrol vessel, for Bangladesh Coast Guard
2020 - BNS Darshak (H 581), a Hydrographic survey vessel, for Bangladesh Navy
2020 - BNS Tallashi (H 582), a Hydrographic survey vessel, for Bangladesh Navy

Ongoing

2019 - a Padma-class patrol vessel , a patrol vessel, for Bangladesh Navy
2019 - a Padma-class patrol vessel , a patrol vessel, for Bangladesh Navy
2019 - a Padma-class patrol vessel , a patrol vessel, for Bangladesh Navy
2019 - a Padma-class patrol vessel , a patrol vessel, for Bangladesh Navy
2019 - a Padma-class patrol vessel , a patrol vessel, for Bangladesh Navy
2020 - a Self propelled floating crane, for Bangladesh Coast Guard
2020 - a Tug Boat, for Bangladesh Coast Guard
2020 - a Tug Boat, for Bangladesh Coast Guard
2020 - a multi-hulled watercraft, for Bangladesh Navy
2020 - a multi-hulled watercraft, for Bangladesh Navy
2020 - a multi-hulled watercraft, for Bangladesh Navy
2020 - a multi-hulled watercraft, for Bangladesh Navy
2021 - a Hydrographic survey vessel, for Bangladesh Navy
2021 - a Hydrographic survey vessel, for Bangladesh Navy
2022 - a multi-hulled watercraft, for Bangladesh Navy
2022 - a multi-hulled watercraft, for Bangladesh Navy
2022 - a multi-hulled watercraft, for Bangladesh Navy
2022 - a multi-hulled watercraft, for Bangladesh Navy

See also
Chittagong Dry Dock Limited
Dockyard and Engineering Works Limited
Shipbuilding in Bangladesh
Defence industry of Bangladesh

References

See also
 Dockyard and Engineering Works Limited
 Shipbuilding in Bangladesh

Defence companies of Bangladesh
Shipbuilding companies of Bangladesh
Shipyards of Bangladesh
Vehicle manufacturing companies established in 1957
1957 establishments in East Pakistan
Organisations based in Khulna